Manohar Prasad Singh is an Indian politician from Bihar. He is the Indian National Congress MLA of Manihari state Assembly constituency.

References

Living people
Indian National Congress politicians from Bihar
Bihar MLAs 2020–2025
Year of birth missing (living people)